The UC Davis School of Education is one of 10 schools and colleges at the University of California, Davis. It offers a wide range of academic and professional development programs that prepare university faculty and research professionals, as well as teaching and administrative leaders, for the world of public education. The PhD, EdD and MA programs prepare students to take leadership roles in advancing research and scholarship, strengthening schools and improving education policy. The teaching credential program prepares students to become teacher leaders and educational advocates. The UC Davis School of Education is committed to confronting and eliminating inequities among people and communities through the generation of impactful knowledge and the promise of education.

The founding dean of the school is Harold Levine. The current dean is Lauren Lindstrom.

In 2017–18, the School had 681 current students and more than 8,000 living alumni with degrees.

The School houses the following labs and centers: California Education Lab, Center for Applied Policy in Education, Center for Community & Citizen Science, Resourcing Excellence in Education, Sacramento Area Science Project, Transformative Justice in Education Center, and Wheelhouse: Center for Community College Leadership and Research.

About
Education on the Davis campus dates back to 1918, shortly after opening, with a training program to prepare teachers to provide instruction in raising crops and animals commercially. The School of Education, formed in 2002 as a reconstitution of a long-standing division within the College of Letters and Sciences, is built on a legacy that began with the first teacher-training program on the Davis campus 85 years ago.

Focus areas at the School of Education are aligned with the needs of the State of California: English learners; math, science and technology; neurodevelopment and education; literacy; and policy. Efforts in faculty hiring, program development and partnership building focus on those needs. The school is expanding its work with practicing educators through professional development programs and graduate degree programs designed especially for veteran educators. As part of a land-grant university, the School has a role in training teachers and education leaders, providing policy analysis and recommendations, conducting research to improve instruction, and increasing the public's awareness and knowledge of education issues.

References

External links
 

University of California, Davis
Schools of education in California
2002 establishments in California